Karin Musier-Forsyth, an American biochemist, is an Ohio Eminent Scholar on the faculty of the Department of Chemistry & Biochemistry at Ohio State University. Musier-Forsyth's research involves biochemical, biophysical and cell-based approaches to understand the interactions of proteins and RNAs involved in protein synthesis and viral replication, especially in HIV.

Personal history & education 
Musier-Forsyth was born in 1962 in Dover, NJ to Horst and Maria Musier, who immigrated to the United States from Germany in the 1950s. Her family moved to St. Petersburg, Florida in 1967 and she grew up on the Isle of Capri in Treasure Island, Florida. Her extracurricular activities throughout elementary school, high school, and college included piano, dance, and gymnastics. She attended Eckerd College in St. Petersburg Florida and enjoyed a liberal arts education, study abroad opportunities in London, England and Vienna, Austria, and research experiences at Georgia Institute of Technology, as well as at Eckerd. She graduated in 1984 with a Bachelor of Science degree in Chemistry.  In 1984, Musier-Forsyth enrolled in graduate school at Cornell University in Ithaca, NY in the Department of Chemistry. Gordon G. Hammes was her mentor and she received her Ph.D. in 1989. Musier-Forsyth met her husband, Craig Forsyth, in graduate school and they were married in Ithaca, NY in 1988.  They have one son, Nicholas, born in St. Paul, Minnesota in 2003..

Professional history 

From 1989-92, Musier -Forsyth did research in the laboratory of Paul Schimmel at MIT as an American Cancer Society postdoctoral fellow.   She was hired as an Assistant Professor in the Department of Chemistry at the University of Minnesota in 1993,  where she was promoted to Associate Professor in 1998 and full Professor in 2003.    In 2007 she was named an Ohio Eminent Scholar and became a Professor in the Department of Chemistry & Biochemistry at Ohio State University.

Awards and honors 

 1996-2001   Camille-Dreyfus Teacher Scholar Award
 2002             Pfizer Award in Enzyme Chemistry
 2003             Merck Professor of Chemistry, University of Minnesota
 2004             Distinguished Women Scholars Award, College of Science and Engineering, University of Minnesota
 2006             Distinguished McKnight University Professor, University of Minnesota
 2007             Ohio Eminent Scholar
2009             American Association for the Advancement of Science (AAAS) Fellow

Scientific contributions 
Musier-Forsyth has published over 100 peer-reviewed articles, and is known for her work on elucidating key protein:nucleic interactions involved in viral replication and in the translation of the genetic code.  Her work has provided key insights into how the aminoacyl tRNA synthetases, the large family of enzymes involved in protein synthesis, attach the correct amino acids to tRNAs and contribute to the fidelity of protein translation.  Her work has also provided fundamental insights into how retroviral replication involves host amino acyl tRNA synthetases and tRNAs. This work highlights potential areas for therapeutic intervention in treating or preventing viral infections.

A world renowned biochemist, Musier-Forsyth is recognized not only for her science expertise but as an educator and mentor.  She has lectured at a wide variety of universities around the world and is active in numerous scientific societies.  She is a peer reviewer for scientific publications and government granting organizations.  Her activities include the following:

 2004-2006          Director of the Chemical-Biology Interface Pre-doctoral Training Program (Minnesota, 2004-2006)
 2003                   Co-chair of the Nucleic Acids Gordon Conference
 2006-2009          Editorial Advisory Board for Accounts of Chemical Research
 2006-2010          NIH Molecular Genetics A study section panel (2006-2010).
2011–present    Co-Director of NIH Cellular and Molecular Biochemical Sciences Training Grant at Ohio State University
2012-16              NIH General Medical Sciences (TWD-B) chartered committee member
2017                   NIH Study Section, Ad Hoc Member of AIDS Molecular and Cellular Biology panel
2018–present      NIH Study Section, Chartered Member of HIV molecular virology, cell biology, and drug development (HVCD) Study Section panel
2006-09              Editorial Advisory Board, Accounts of Chemical Research
2010                   Guest Editor, Special Issue of RNA Biology on “RNA Chaperones”
2011–present      Editorial Board Member, RNA Biology
2012-2017          Editorial Board Member, Journal of Biological Chemistry
2014                   Guest Editor, Special issue of Virus Research
2016-2018          Editorial Board Member, Biophysical Journal
2018–present      Associate Editor, Journal of Biological Chemistry

Representative publications 

 Jin D, Musier-Forsyth K. Role of host tRNAs and aminoacyl-tRNA synthetases in retroviral replication. J Biol Chem. 2019;294(14):5352‐5364.
 Brigham BS, Kitzrow JP, Reyes JC, Musier-Forsyth K, Munro JB. Intrinsic conformational dynamics of the HIV-1 genomic RNA 5'UTR. Proc Natl Acad Sci U S A. 2019;116(21):10372‐10381.
 Musier-Forsyth K. Aminoacyl-tRNA synthetases and tRNAs in human disease: an introduction to the JBC Reviews thematic series. J Biol Chem. 2019;294(14):5292‐5293.
 Olson ED, Musier-Forsyth K. Retroviral Gag protein-RNA interactions: Implications for specific genomic RNA packaging and virion assembly. Semin Cell Dev Biol. 2019;86:129‐139.
 Wu W, Hatterschide J, Syu YC, et al. Human T-cell leukemia virus type 1 Gag domains have distinct RNA-binding specificities with implications for RNA packaging and dimerization. J Biol Chem. 2018;293(42):16261‐16276.
 Antonucci JM, Kim SH, St Gelais C, et al. SAMHD1 Impairs HIV-1 Gene Expression and Negatively Modulates Reactivation of Viral Latency in CD4+ T Cells. J Virol. 2018;92(15):e00292-18. Published 2018 Jul 17.
 Bacusmo JM, Kuzmishin AB, Cantara WA, Goto Y, Suga H, Musier-Forsyth K. Quality control by trans-editing factor prevents global mistranslation of non-protein amino acid α-aminobutyrate. RNA Biol. 2018;15(4-5):576‐585.
 Todd GC, Duchon A, Inlora J, Olson ED, Musier-Forsyth K, Ono A. Inhibition of HIV-1 Gag-membrane interactions by specific RNAs. RNA. 2017;23(3):395‐405.
 Berkhout B, Mouland AJ, Musier-Forsyth K. Retroviral nucleocapsid protein and assembly. Foreword. Virus Res. 2014;193:1.
 Cantara WA, Olson ED, Forsyth KM. Progress and outlook in structural biology of large viral RNAs. Virus Res. 2014;193:24‐38.
 Dewan V, Reader J, Forsyth KM. Role of aminoacyl-tRNA synthetases in infectious diseases and targets for therapeutic development. Top Curr Chem. 2014;344:293‐329.
 Rein A, Datta SA, Jones CP, Musier-Forsyth K. Diverse interactions of retroviral Gag proteins with RNAs. Trends Biochem Sci. 2011;36(7):373‐380.
 Yadavalli SS, Musier-Forsyth K, Ibba M. The return of pretransfer editing in protein synthesis. Proc Natl Acad Sci U S A. 2008;105(49):19031‐19032.
 Kleiman L, Jones CP, Musier-Forsyth K. Formation of the tRNALys packaging complex in HIV-1. FEBS Lett. 2010;584(2):359‐365.
 Qualley DF, Cooper SE, Ross JL, Olson ED, Cantara WA, Musier-Forsyth K. Solution Conformation of Bovine Leukemia Virus Gag Suggests an Elongated Structure. J Mol Biol. 2019;431(6):1203‐1216.
 Musier-Forsyth K. RNA remodeling by chaperones and helicases. RNA Biol. 2010;7(6):632‐633.
 Levin JG, Mitra M, Mascarenhas A, Musier-Forsyth K. Role of HIV-1 nucleocapsid protein in HIV-1 reverse transcription. RNA Biol. 2010;7(6):754‐774.

References

Living people
Eckerd College alumni
Ohio State University faculty
American women biochemists
Cornell University alumni
Year of birth missing (living people)
American women academics
21st-century American women